Sociology of the World Religions: Introduction is a book by Max Weber, a German economist and sociologist. The original edition was in German.

External links

Online ebook of Sociology of the World Religions: Introduction

Sociology books
Works by Max Weber